This is a list of members of the Western Australian Legislative Council from 22 May 1971 to 21 May 1974. The chamber had 30 seats made up of 15 provinces each electing two members, on a system of rotation whereby one-half of the members would retire at each triennial election.

Notes
 On 20 October 1973, West Province Country Party MLC Fred White died. No by-election was held due to the proximity of the 1974 election.

Sources
 
 
 

Members of Western Australian parliaments by term